James Ricketts may refer to:

 James B. Ricketts (1817–1887), United States Army officer
 James Ricketts (cricketer) (1842–1894), English cricketer